The Rawata Pass Incident was a lagoon obstruction on the island of Marakei in 1912.

After conflict with neighbouring Bwainuna village about dowry for a marriage, Tawata Tiloio organised Norauea village to obstruct the Rawata Pass with canoes. This led to the lagoon being cut off from the sea and pressure on Bwainuna to satisfy the demands of the bride's family.

The incident is a legend in Kiribati. A canoe from the incident is displayed in the Kiribati National Cultural Centre and Museum.

References
Naina, Shirley (1974). History of Marakei. Micronesia Press.

History of Kiribati
1912 in Oceania
20th century in Kiribati